The Series 30, often shortened as S30, is a software platform and application user interface created by Nokia for its entry level mobile phones, lower than Series 40. S30 phones are not capable of running Java apps. In 2014, Microsoft acquired Nokia's mobile phones business and later discontinued S30 in favor of Series 30+.

Originally, S30 was supposed to have just one menu key, but a second one was added with the release of the Nokia 1110. All S30 devices do not have a 5-way d-pad, only a 4-way d-pad, except the Nokia 1100 and Nokia 2100 which just have a 2-way d-pad.

List of devices
The following is a list of Series 30 devices released by Nokia:
 Released in 2003
 Nokia 1100
 Nokia 2100
 Nokia 2300
 Released in 2004
 Nokia 2600
 Released in 2005
 Nokia 1110
 Nokia 1108
 Nokia 1101
 Nokia 2255
 Released in 2006
 Nokia 1600
 Nokia 2310
 Nokia 1112
 Released in 2007
 Nokia 1650
 Nokia 1200 
 Nokia 1208
 Released in 2008
   Nokia 1209
 Released in 2009
   Nokia 5030 XpressRadio
 Nokia 1202
 Nokia 1661
 Released in 2010
 Nokia 1616
 Nokia 1800
 Nokia 1280
   Nokia C1-00
 Released in 2011
 Nokia X1-00 
 Nokia X1-01
 Nokia 100
 Nokia 101
 Released in 2012
 Nokia 103
 Released in 2013
 Nokia 105
 Nokia 106
 Nokia 107

See also 
 Series 20
 Series 30+
 Series 40
 Series 60
 Series 80
 Series 90

References

External links 
 Understanding series 30,40 vs. 60

Nokia platforms
Mobile software
Mobile operating systems
Embedded operating systems